Willie Wilbert Herenton (born April 23, 1940) is an American politician and a Civil Rights leader. He was elected as the first elected African-American Mayor of Memphis, Tennessee. He was subsequently re-elected to an unprecedented five consecutive terms. During his tenure, Herenton worked to bridge the deep racial divide in Memphis. Under his leadership, the city experienced an economic boom that put it on solid financial footing, resulted in the redevelopment of downtown and the arrival of professional sports teams: the Memphis Grizzlies and Memphis Redbirds.

Herenton ran for a sixth term as Memphis mayor in 2019, but lost to incumbent Jim Strickland.

Biography
Willie Wilbert Herenton was born to Ruby Lee Harris in Memphis, Tennessee. Raised by a single mother, Herenton was encouraged at a young age to pursue his dreams of becoming a Golden Gloves boxer. Known as a driving force in his life, Ruby Harris fostered her son's passion for education; eventually leading to Herenton graduating from Le Moyne-Owen College with a bachelors of science in Elementary Education and from the University of Memphis (formerly Memphis State) with a masters in Educational Administration. However, segregation forced Herenton to leave Memphis to attain his doctorate in education at Southern Illinois University. Dr. Herenton served as the first African-American superintendent of Memphis City Schools for 12 years and the first elected African-American mayor of Memphis, Tennessee for 17 years.  His constituents often referred to him as "King Willie", after he was televised saying he didn't care whether Memphians voted for him or not- and still won the race.  Scandal ensued when he started a second chance program for first time offenders, allegedly connected to his relationship to a female felon.
Local news covered this extensively.

From Teacher to Superintendent 
After graduating from Le Moyne-Owen, Herenton began working at Memphis City Schools as a fifth-grade teacher in Memphis. During the 1968 Memphis Sanitation Strike, Herenton marched in solidarity with the sanitation workers; however, the choice to march with Martin Luther King, Jr. and wear the sign declaring "I AM A MAN" resulted in threats of termination and ostracization from school district leadership and fellow teachers. But in 1969 Herenton was appointed principal of Bethel Grove Elementary and at 28 became the youngest principal ever hired in Memphis. Three years later, he completed his Ph.D. degree at Southern Illinois University. A year after returning from the Rockefeller Foundation Superintendent Training Program, Dr. Herenton became the Deputy Superintendent of Memphis City Schools. In 1979, Herenton became the first African-American superintendent of the Memphis Public Schools. During Dr. Herenton's 12-year tenure as MCS superintendent, ambitious programs aimed at creating opportunities and services to disadvantaged youth, as well as expanding teacher freedoms, were implemented. However, he was mired in controversy after accusations of sexual harassment from a female teacher surfaced in 1988, leading to his divorce, an admission of an affair, and an out-of-court settlement. Further criticism of his performance as superintendent, as well as an impending mayoral campaign, led him to resign in 1991.

1991 Mayoral Election and Tenure as Mayor 
In April 1991, more than 3000 predominantly African-American citizens of Memphis gathered in the Mid-South Coliseum and selected Dr. Herenton as the consensus candidate for the 1991 mayoral election. On October 3, Dr. Herenton became the first African-American to be elected mayor of Memphis. Herenton won his first term by defeating incumbent mayor Richard Hackett in 1991 by 146 votes. In earlier history, an African-American had never been appointed to the position.

Herenton went on to be reelected five consecutive times.

He was elected to his fifth term in office on October 4, 2007.

Herenton was selected to the long list for the 2008 World Mayor award; however, he was not selected for this honor.

End of Tenure as Mayor 
On March 20, 2008, Herenton announced that he would be stepping down from his position as Memphis' mayor, effective July 31, 2008. This move angered many politicians in the city including Councilwoman Carol Chumney, a candidate he beat for mayor of Memphis in October 2007. He made this announcement just a little over 90 days after his re-election. Herenton stated his early departure was to seek the position again of superintendent of Memphis City Schools, dispelling speculation that he was stepping down because of a run for Congress or impending legal troubles from an ongoing criminal investigation at City Hall. He later stated that he would not leave the office of mayor unless he got the position as the superintendent of schools. Herenton said that he ran for re-election only in order to protect the city of Memphis from the other main candidates, Herman Morris and Councilwoman Carol Chumney. When the day came, Herenton failed to step down as Mayor and said he would serve out his term until 2011.

In April 2009, however, Herenton formed an exploratory committee to run in the 2010 US Congressional Election for the 9th District of Tennessee, presumably in the Democratic primary against incumbent Steve Cohen. On June 25, 2009, Herenton announced his resignation as Mayor, effective July 10.  On July 6, he announced that he would delay his retirement until July 30.

He resigned from office on July 30, 2009. Memphis City Council Chairman Myron Lowery was appointed as mayor pro tempore.

2010 Democratic Primary
In 2010, Herenton announced that he would run against Congressman Steve Cohen in the Democratic Primary for Tennessee's 9th congressional district—a historically majority African-American and heavily Democratic district.

In September 2009, Herenton attracted controversy with his statement in a radio interview that Congressman Steve Cohen "really does not think very much of African-Americans" and that "[Cohen]'s played the black community well." Herenton's campaign manager Sidney Chism, who is also African American, told the New York Times that the Memphis-area congressional seat Cohen holds "was set aside for people who look like me. It wasn't set aside for a Jew or a Christian. It was set aside so that blacks could have representation." The National Jewish Democratic Council (NJDC) criticized Herenton for these remarks, stating that his comments were "unacceptable in a Democratic primary or anywhere in our political discourse."

Despite Herenton's attempts to isolate Cohen from the African-American voting demographic, Cohen received endorsements from both President Barack Obama and the Congressional Black Caucus. Cohen won the Democratic primary election, and Herenton gained only 20% of the vote.

2019 Mayoral Race 
On April 5, 2018 Dr. Herenton announced his intention to run for mayor of Memphis for a 6th term.

Just over a year later, Herenton kicked off his 2019 campaign with several hundred supporters at a rally at his campaign headquarters. At the kickoff, Herenton told supporters that he intended to complete an agenda of justice left unfinished and combat the elitist power structure driving city policy. The Memphis Police Union endorsed Dr. Herenton for mayor for the first time at the campaign kickoff.

On July 27, AFSCME local 1733 endorsed Herenton for Mayor. During the press conference, Dr. Herenton noted how in 1968 he marched with Dr. Martin Luther King, Jr. and Local 1733 in the Memphis Sanitation Workers Strike, and now for the first time in 2019 AFSCME is standing with him and endorsing him for mayor.

On August 1, IBEW Local 1288 (the union that represents the city's utility workers at MLGW) endorsed Dr. Herenton for mayor. At the announcement, union leaders praised Herenton for looking out for workers during his initial tenure as mayor.

On October 3, as the results came in, Herenton conceded to Strickland.

Personal life
Dr. Herenton has four children; he and his first wife are divorced. His grandson Willie played college basketball at Miami (Florida).

References

External links 
 Memphis Commercial Appeal coverage of Mayor Herenton's political career

Living people
African-American people in Tennessee politics
1940 births
Mayors of Memphis, Tennessee
Tennessee Democrats
African-American mayors in Tennessee
LeMoyne–Owen College alumni
University of Memphis alumni
Southern Illinois University alumni
21st-century African-American people
20th-century African-American people